The John C. Mabee Stakes is an American   Thoroughbred horse race contested in early August at the Del Mar Racetrack in Del Mar, California. It is run on the turf for fillies and mares, age three or older, at a distance of one and one-eighth miles. Downgraded to a Grade II stakes in 2010, the John C. Mabee Handicap currently offers a purse of $200,000. Part of the Breeders' Cup Challenge series, the winner of the 2010 race automatically qualifies for the Breeders' Cup Filly & Mare Turf.

The race is named in honor of John C. Mabee (1921-2002), a three-time winner of the Eclipse Award for Outstanding Breeder as owner of Golden Eagle Farm and someone the New York Times Company's subsidiary About.com calls  "a California racing icon." Through 2001 the race was known as the Ramona Handicap, in honor of Ramona, California where Mabee's breeding farm was located, and as the John C. Mabee Ramona Handicap in 2002.

It was first run in 1945 on dirt at a distance of one mile (8 furlongs), it was not contested again until 1959 when the distance was set at its current  miles (9 furlongs). It was run in two divisions in 1965, 1966, 1969 and was switched to the turf course in 1970.

In winning the 1971 race, Street Dancer set a new Del Mar course record then won again in 1972, breaking her own record.

Records
Speed  record:
 1:46.34 Precious Kitten (2007)

Most wins:
 3 - Flawlessly (1992, 1993, 1994)

Most wins by an owner:
 3 - Harbor View Farm (1992, 1993, 1994)

Most wins by a jockey:
 5 - Bill Shoemaker (1974, 1975, 1980, 1983, 1985)
 5 - Corey Nakatani (1995, 1996, 1998, 2006, 2012)
 5 - Flavien Prat (2016, 2018, 2019, 2020, 2021)

Most wins by a trainer:
 9 - Charlie Whittingham (1968, 1975, 1976, 1980, 1981, 1991, 1992, 1993, 1994)

Winners

References

 The John C. Mabee Handicap at Pedigree Query
 The John C. Mabee Handicap at the NTRA

Del Mar Racetrack
Horse races in California
Grade 1 stakes races in the United States
Mile category horse races for fillies and mares
Turf races in the United States
Recurring sporting events established in 1945